A bombing range usually refers to a remote military aerial bombing and gunnery training range used by combat aircraft to attack ground targets (air-to-ground bombing), or a remote area reserved for researching, developing, testing and evaluating new weapons and ammunition. Bombing ranges are used for precision targeting of high-explosive aerial bombs, precision-guided munitions and other aircraft ordnance, as opposed to a field firing range used by infantry and tanks. Various non-explosive inert "practice bombs" are also extensively used for precision aerial targeting bombing practice—to simulate various explosive aerial bomb types and minimise damage and environmental impact to bombing ranges.

United Kingdom 
The Defence Training Estate of the UK Ministry of Defence currently runs five Air Weapons Ranges for military operational training: RAF Holbeach and RAF Donna Nook in Lincolnshire (England), RAF Pembrey in Carmarthenshire (Wales), RAF Tain in Rossshire and Cape Wrath in Sutherland (Scotland). A former air weapons range RAF Wainfleet in Lincolnshire was decommissioned in 2009. It had been in use since 1890 for artillery training by the 1st Lincolnshire Artillery Volunteers.

Hazards
Bombing ranges pose several hazards, even when not in use or closed. Unexploded ordnance is often the biggest threat. Once a bombing range has been permanently closed, they are sometimes cleared of unexploded ordnance so that the land can be put to other use or to reduce the chance of accidental detonation causing harm to people near the range, trespassers or authorized personnel. Cleanup or complete cleanup may be put off indefinitely depending on the cost, the danger to personnel clearing the area, the land's potential use, the likelihood of an explosion being triggered and the probability of someone being around to trigger or be harmed by an explosion.

The wreckage can also be hazardous. Bomb fragments and other wreckage can cause lacerations and puncture wounds if not removed before the land is put to other uses, such as farming or recreation, or if it is handled by curious trespassers or untrained scrap metal salvagers. The fragments, wreckage and residues may also contain toxic substances, such as nitrate. Exposure can come from direct contact, but it can also come offsite by the air, from surface or groundwater contamination, or by the uptake of toxins by plants and animals consumed by humans. Which route of exposure is most likely depends on the type of substances present, the proximity of inhabited areas and whether unauthorized personnel trespass on the range. Developing nations and those in an economic crisis often have a haphazard salvage industry involved in legal and illegal activities. In these areas, bombing ranges are scoured for salvageable metals. Unusual items, sometimes the most dangerous, are made into "trinkets". The danger is greatly increased when the materials are melted down or worked by hand, exposing workers to toxic fumes.

See also
 Nevada Test and Training Range
 Chocolate Mountain Aerial Gunnery Range
 Barry M. Goldwater Air Force Range
 Tactical bombing

References

 
Bombs